= UQROP =

The Union Québécoise de Réhabilitation des Oiseaux de Proie (Quebec's Birds of Prey Rehabilitation Union) is a non profit organization created in 1987. Its mission is to provide help for the conservation of both birds of prey and their natural environment. It has two divisions: the "Clinique des Oiseaux de Proie" (Birds of Prey Clinic) and an information office to publicize the plight of these endangered birds. It is located in Quebec, Canada.

The UQROP receives no government subsidies.
